Marko 1927 Football Club is a Greek football club based in Markopoulo, East Attica, Greece. Its colours are green and white. Its logo is a vine leaf in honour of the vineyards of Mesogeia area.

Honours

Domestic
 Delta Ethniki Champions: 1
 1994–95
 Athens FCA Champions: 1
 1983–84
 Athens FCA Cup Winners: 1
 1994–95
 East Attica FCA Champions: 2
 2018–19, 2021-22

References

Football clubs in Greece
Association football clubs established in 1927
1927 establishments in Greece
Gamma Ethniki clubs